Kewanee Township is one of twenty-four townships in Henry County, Illinois, USA.  As of the 2010 census, its population was 10,162 and it contained 4,608 housing units.

Geography

Cities, towns, villages
 Kewanee (north half)

Adjacent townships
 Annawan Township (north)
 Mineral Township, Bureau County (northeast)
 Neponset Township, Bureau County (east)
 Elmira Township, Stark County (southeast)
 Wethersfield Township (south)
 Burns Township (west)
 Cornwall Township (northwest)

Cemeteries
The township contains these eight cemeteries: Garden of Peace, Mount Olivet, Old Kewanee Public, Orthodox, Pace, Pleasant View, Saint Michael and South Pleasant View.

Major highways
  U.S. Route 34
  Illinois Route 78
  Illinois Route 81

Airports and landing strips
 Kewanee Hospital Heliport

Landmarks
 Baker Park
 Chautaqua Park
 Francis Park
 Johnson Sauk Trail State Park (south half)
 Northeast Park
 West Park

Demographics

School districts
 Annawan Community Unit School District 226
 Kewanee Community Unit School District 229
 Wethersfield Community Unit School District 230

Political districts
 Illinois's 17th congressional district
 State House District 74
 State Senate District 37

References
 United States Census Bureau 2008 TIGER/Line Shapefiles
 
 United States National Atlas

External links
 City-Data.com
 Illinois State Archives
 Township Officials of Illinois

Townships in Henry County, Illinois
Townships in Illinois